A college of advanced technology (CAT) was a type of higher education institution established in 1956 in England and Wales following the publication of a government white paper on technical education which listed 24 technical colleges in receipt of 75% grant for parts of their advanced work.

The government confirmed that the proportion of advanced work at these colleges should be increased so that they could develop as quickly as possible into colleges of advanced technology. Eventually ten of the 24 were confirmed as CATs. Birmingham College of Advanced Technology was the first to be so designated, in 1956.

Originally under the control of local education authorities, on 1 April 1962 the CATs were removed from local authority control and became autonomous national institutions funded directly by the Ministry of Education. Following the Robbins Report of 1963, the colleges of advanced technology were expanded and awarded university status in 1966, sometimes grouped together with other 1960s "plate glass universities".

The colleges

The ten CATs and the universities they became were:

Birmingham CAT became Aston University (the first designated college of advanced technology)
Loughborough CAT became Loughborough University of Technology (afterwards Loughborough University)
Northampton CAT (London) became City University London (now City, University of London)
Chelsea CAT became Chelsea College of Science and Technology as part of the University of London then later was subsumed into King's College London
Battersea CAT became the University of Surrey
Brunel CAT became Brunel University
Bristol CAT became the Bath University of Technology in 1966 (afterwards University of Bath)
Welsh CAT (in Cardiff) became the University of Wales Institute of Science and technology (UWIST) before eventually merging with other institutions to become part of the University of Wales, then Cardiff University
Salford CAT (the Royal College of Advanced Technology) became the University of Salford
Bradford Institute of Technology became University of Bradford

See also 

 Polytechnic (United Kingdom)

References 

Engineering education in the United Kingdom
Higher education in the United Kingdom
 
History of education in the United Kingdom